Rich Simmons is a British pop artist based in London.

Overview

Simmons' depiction of Batman Kissing Superman gained notability when it was painted in London and New York City.

In 2012, 2013 and 2014 Simmons had solo shows at Imitate Modern in London's West End. From 2014 to 2015 he had a solo show at Soho Contemporary Art in SoHo, Manhattan.

See also
 List of street artists

References

External links
 Simmons' website

1986 births
Living people
Artists from London
British pop artists